The Canon de 12 cm L mle 1931 was a medium field gun made and used by Belgium in World War II. Captured guns were taken into Wehrmacht service after the surrender of Belgium in May 1940 as the 12 cm K 370(b) where it was generally used on coast defense duties.

It was rather heavy for its size, but had a good range. The split trail had large spades that had to be pounded into the ground to anchor the weapon in place.

See also
BL 4.5 inch
122 mm gun M1931 (A-19)

References 

 Gander, Terry and Chamberlain, Peter. Weapons of the Third Reich: An Encyclopedic Survey of All Small Arms, Artillery and Special Weapons of the German Land Forces 1939-1945. New York: Doubleday, 1979 
 Chamberlain, Peter & Gander, Terry. Heavy Artillery. New York: Arco, 1975 

World War II artillery of Belgium
120 mm artillery